Earthworm is a common name referring to many various species of worm which typically live underground.

Earthworm or The Earthworm may also refer to:
Earthworm (album), an album by Circle
The Earthworm (album), a 1995 hip-hop album by LPG
The Earthworm, a character from the 1967 novel James and the Giant Peach